Calculated Risk is a term for a risky decision that may be taken (typically in a desperate situation or in the absence of complete information) after a careful consideration of the likelihood and impact of failure in comparison to the rewards of success. 

A notable example is the order of Admiral Chester W. Nimitz to the U.S. troops before the Battle of Midway to avoid “exposure of your force to attack by superior enemy forces without good prospect of inflicting . . . greater damage on the enemy.”

Calculated risk may also refer to:
 Calculated Risk (blog), a finance and economics blog
 Calculated Risk (film), a 1963 British crime thriller film 
 Calculated Risk (novel), a 1960 science fiction novel by Charles Eric Maine
 A Calculated Risk, a 1992 financial thriller novel by Katherine Neville